Markkleeberg Nord is a railway station in Markkleeberg, Saxony, Germany. The station is located on the Leipzig–Hof railway. The train services are operated by Deutsche Bahn. The station was opened with the commissioning of the S-Bahn Mitteldeutschland on 15 December 2013. It is located on the suburban tracks, line number 6377, and because of the space needed for the platform, the main line between Leipzig-Connewitz and Gaschwitz has been reduced to one track since 2013.

Train services
The following services currently call at the station:

References

External links

Nord
Railway stations in Germany opened in 2013